Jeff Carr may refer to:

 Jeff Carr (Australian politician) (born 1944), member of the state parliament of Western Australia
 Jeff Carr (Canadian politician), member of the provincial legislature of New Brunswick
 Jeff Carr (American politician), mayor of Eagle Nest, New Mexico